Blazein is a bio-active steroid made by Agaricus blazei.

References

Sterols